Michael Zimmer may refer to:

 Michael Zimmer (academic), privacy and social media scholar
 Michael Zimmer (footballer) (born 1955), German footballer
 Mike Zimmer, American football coach